is a Japanese football player. He plays for Vonds Ichihara on loan from Verspah Oita.

Career
Takuya Nogami joined J2 League club Oita Trinita in 2017. On June 21, he debuted in Emperor's Cup (v FC Machida Zelvia). In July, he moved to Verspah Oita and the loan was extended for 2018 season.

Club statistics
Updated to 22 February 2018.

References

External links

1998 births
Living people
Association football people from Ōita Prefecture
Japanese footballers
J2 League players
Japan Football League players
Oita Trinita players
Verspah Oita players
Association football midfielders